Neptunomonas japonica is a species of bacteria. It is Gram-negative, rod-shaped, non-spore-forming and motile by means of a single polar or subterminal flagellum. Its type strain is JAMM 0745T (=JCM 14595T=DSM 18939T). It was first found in carcasses of a Sperm whale and is closely related to a symbiotic bacterial clone of the polychaete Osedax japonicus.

References

Further reading
Whitman, William B., et al., eds. Bergey's manual® of systematic bacteriology. Vol. 5. Springer, 2012.
Dworkin, Martin, and Stanley Falkow, eds. The Prokaryotes: Vol. 6: Proteobacteria: Gamma Subclass. Vol. 6. Springer, 2006.

Acton, Q. Ashton. Issues in Biological and Life Sciences Research: 2012 Edition. ScholarlyEditions, 2013.

External links

LPSN
WORMS entry
Type strain of Neptunomonas japonica at BacDive -  the Bacterial Diversity Metadatabase

Oceanospirillales
Bacteria described in 2008